Frans Petter Eldh (born 19 September 1983 in Gothenburg) is a Swedish jazz bass player and composer, who predominantly has worked first in Denmark, and since 2009 he has lived in Berlin.

Biography

Eldh was raised in a family of artists. At the age of eight he started to play the guitar and bought his first hip-hop album when nine. Three years later he substituted the guitar for the double bass. When he turned thirteen under the influence of the music of Charlie Parker, he got into Jazz. He received his first musical training between 1999 and 2002 at the Sinclair  Music School in Uddevalla. He continued his studies from 2002 to 2004 at the Jazz School of Skurup, in order to go to Copenhagen, where the Rhythmic Music Conservatory in Copenhagen, Denmark. He received his Master's degree in 2009. In the mid 2010 he collaborated with Django Bates on the Charlie Parker tribute Conformation (2011) among other things.

Honors 
2006: Awarded The International Jazz Price Getxo in SpainEldh, with Marius Neset for the album People Are Machines.
2012: With Schneeweiss und Rosenrot he received the New German Jazz Award for the album Pool

Discography 
2008: Suite for the Seven Mountains (Calibrated Records), within Marius Neset's 'People Are Machines'
2009: Old New Borrowed Blue (Stunt Records), with Magnus Hjorth Trio
2010: Plastic Moon (Stunt Records), Petter Eldh/Magnus Hjorth/Kazumi Ikenaga
2010: There Is an Ocean Between Us (Hoob Jazz), The World with Anton Eger, Fabian Kallerdahl
2012: Confirmation (Lost Marble), with Django Bates Belovèd
2012: Pool (Yellowbird), Schneeweiss & Rosenrot with Johanna Borchert, Lucia Cadotsch, Marc Lohr)
2013: Starlight (Unit Records), Slavin/Eldh/Lillinger
2015: Pinball (ACT Music), with Marius Neset
2015: Firehouse (Clean Feed), with Gard Nilssen's Acoustic Unity

With Django Bates
The Study of Touch (ECM, 2017)

References

External links 

1958 births
Living people
Swedish jazz double-bassists
Avant-garde jazz double-bassists
Avant-garde jazz musicians
Swedish jazz composers
21st-century double-bassists